Allan Wayne Felder (May 26, 1943 – November 7, 1999) was an American songwriter. He had many successes with songs created during the 1960s, 1970s, and 1980s – frequently collaborating with Norman Harris, Bunny Sigler, and Ronnie Baker. His sister is Nadine Felder of Honey And The Bees. Since 2015, the publishing interest of Allan Felder’s catalog has been represented by Reservoir Media Management.

References

1943 births
1999 deaths
American male songwriters
Musicians from Philadelphia
Songwriters from Pennsylvania
20th-century male musicians